Catalina Guerra Münchmeyer (Santiago de Chile, 19 August 1969) is a Chilean actress of theater, films and television.

Life

Born in a family of actors. She is the second daughter of Jorge Guerra (1942–2009), a prominent actor and theater director known for his characterter  Pin Pon, and Gloria Münchmeyer (1938–), a prominent actress.

She began her acting career in 1990 on Channel 13, followed by some successful roles, in Acércate más (1990), Ellas porlas (1991), Love at home (1995), Adrenalina (1996) and Wild beach (1997).

As of 1999, she only appeared in soap operas produced by Televisión Nacional de Chile. Her career prospects began to improve when she starred in Coven (1999), Holy Thief (2000) Amores de mercado (2001), Purasangre (2002) and Destinations crossed (2004). Her performances received good reviews on the state channel, which allowed her to star in the sitcom Hotel para dos (2007). Although Guerra had become one of TVN's most diverse supporting actresses, her contract ended in 2007.

In 2010, she co-starred with Fernanda Urrejola in the drama Mujeres de lujo de Chilevisión, playing a lesbian who practices luxury prostitution in an exclusive club. The bet received great acceptance in the audience.

Between 2010 and 2017, she regularly participated in Channel 13 castings, under an exclusive contract. In 2010, she headed First Lady, along with Julio Milostich (being the winner of the best supporting actress at the Fotech Awards), between 2011 and 2017 she participated in the phenomenon Single Again, for three seasons and later made interventions of the cast de Las Vega's (2013), Chipe libre (2014) and Veinteañero a los 40 (2016).

In 2018 she signed with AGTV Producciones to participate in La reina de Franklin (2018) and Amor a la Catalán (2019).

Filmography

Films

Telenovelas

TV series

References

1969 births
Living people
Actresses from Santiago
Chilean people of German descent
Chilean film actresses
Chilean stage actresses
Chilean telenovela actresses
Chilean television actresses
Chilean women comedians